Dan Mullins (born 15 June 1978) is an English metal drummer. He is most known for being the drummer of the death/doom metal band My Dying Bride. Mullins has cited drummers such as Buddy Rich, Mike Portnoy, Sean Reinert, and Paul Mazurkiewicz as influences.

Discography

Ephitaph
Inscriptions (1994 demo)
Unearthed (1995 demo)

Broken
Velvet dune (1996 demo)
Skytorn (1997 album)

Thine
Journeys (1996 demo)
The Blue Tape (1997 demo)
A Town Like This (1998 album)
In Therapy (2001 album)

Sermon of Hypocrisy
To Burn What He Creates (2001 demo)
Masochistic Discipline (2003 demo)

The Axis of Perdition
Deleted Scenes from the Transition Hospital (2005 album)
Urfe (2009 album)
Tenements of the Anointed Flesh (2011 album)

KryoKill
The Soul Agenda (2006 demo)

Bal-Sagoth
The Chthonic Chronicles (2006 album)

My Dying Bride
An Ode to Woe (2008 live album)
For Lies I Sire (2009 album)
Bring Me Victory (2009 EP)
Feel The Misery (2015 album)

Other work
Dan stood in for Chthonic's drummer at Bloodstock 2012.

References

1978 births
Living people
English heavy metal drummers
21st-century drummers